Kelebang is a state constituency in Malacca, Malaysia, that has been represented in the Malacca State Legislative Assembly.

The state constituency was first contested in 2004 and is mandated to return a single Assemblyman to the Melaka State Legislative Assembly under the first-past-the-post voting system.

Definition 
The Kelebang constituency contains the polling districts of Seberang Gajah, Bukit Rambai, Kampung Pinang, Kelebang Besar, Pulau Gadong, Pekan Kelebang Besar and Kelebang Kechil.

Demographics

History

Polling districts
According to the gazette issued on 31 October 2022, the Kelebang constituency has a total of 7 polling districts.

Representation history

Election results

References

Malacca state constituencies